"Money Honey" is the title of a 1975 international hit single by the Bay City Rollers, taken from their album Rock n' Roll Love Letter and in the UK on their album Dedication.  The power-pop recording was issued in the US as the album's lead single in January 1976, reaching number nine on the Hot 100 in Billboard magazine that March. "Money Honey" was the Bay City Rollers' second US Top 10 hit. It reached number seven on the Cash Box chart. The follow-up single was the album's title track, "Rock and Roll Love Letter" (US No. 28). In the UK, "Money Honey" was released in November 1975 and reached number three, becoming the group's ninth Top 10 single.

Outside the US, "Money Honey" was yet a bigger hit, such as in Australia (No. 3) and in Ireland (No. 4). The song enjoyed its greatest international popularity in Canada, where it spent one week at number one, and ranks as the 22nd greatest hit of 1976.

Chart performance

Weekly charts

Year-end charts

Track listing 
1. "Money Honey" - 3:17  
2. "Maryanne" - 2:48

Credits 
 Photography [Coverphoto] - Arista

References

External links
 

1975 singles
Bay City Rollers songs
1975 songs
Arista Records singles
Songs written by Eric Faulkner
Songs written by Stuart Wood (musician)
RPM Top Singles number-one singles